Daniel Ralph Iassogna (born May 3, 1969) is an American umpire in Major League Baseball. In 2012, Iassogna worked his first World Series. He was promoted to crew chief for the 2020 season.

Umpiring career
His professional umpiring career began in 1992, and he advanced to the International League in 1998. In 2004, Iassogna was promoted to the major leagues to replace the retired Steve Rippley.

He umpired in the postseason in only his second year as a full-time major league umpire, and has worked three World Series (2012, 2017, 2022), six League Championship Series (2010, 2013, 2014, 2015, 2020, 2021) and seven Division Series (2005, 2007, 2009, 2011, 2012, 2017, 2022). Iassogna also worked the 2011 All-Star Game and the 2009 World Baseball Classic.

Notable games
Iassogna was the third base umpire when Detroit Tigers pitcher Justin Verlander threw a no-hitter at Comerica Park against the Milwaukee Brewers on June 12, . Five days prior to Verlander's no-hitter, Iassogna was also at third base in a game between the Boston Red Sox and the Oakland Athletics in which Boston pitcher Curt Schilling had a no-hitter until Shannon Stewart broke up the no-hitter with a single with two outs in the bottom of the ninth inning.

Iassogna was the second base umpire for Verlander's second no-hitter, thrown on May 7,  against the Toronto Blue Jays.

In Game 2 of the 2012 World Series, Iassogna was the home plate umpire. In the second inning, Delmon Young doubled down the left field line. Prince Fielder, who was attempting to score on the play, was called out at home by Iassogna. Both Fielder and Tigers manager Jim Leyland argued, but video replays showed that the correct call was made.

On May 15, 2016, Iassogna was the home plate umpire when the Toronto Blue Jays visited the Texas Rangers (baseball). This game is notable for being the final regular season game between the teams that met in the 2015 American League Division Series. Late in the game, a fight broke out between Blue Jays outfielder José Bautista and Rangers second baseman Rougned Odor when Bautista slid late into second base. Iassogna ejected Bautista, Odor, Blue Jays manager John Gibbons and later Blue Jays pitcher Jesse Chavez. Odor and Bautista both served suspensions for their actions.

On October 6, 2017, Iassogna was the home plate umpire in Game 2 of the 2017 American League Division Series when in the bottom of the 6th inning with 2 outs, Iassogna ruled Cleveland Indians batter Lonnie Chisenhall was hit by a pitch by New York Yankees pitcher Chad Green though replays showed that the pitch might have hit his bat before landing in the glove of Yankees catcher Gary Sánchez which would've been the third out of the inning. The next batter Francisco Lindor then promptly hit a grand slam and the Indians would go on to win the game 9–8 in 13 innings.

Personal life
Prior to pursuing umpiring, Iassogna earned a BA in English from the University of Connecticut. Having considered firefighting before becoming an umpire, Iassogna volunteers with the Chicago Fire Department's "Bucks for the Burn Camp," Team Kevin brain tumor research and the New York Fire Department's "Lil Bravest" charities; he also plays the Great Highland Bagpipes. He is married and has two daughters.

In popular culture
Iassogna was mentioned on @midnight on July 27, 2016, by Matt Mira.

See also

 List of Major League Baseball umpires

References

External links
Major league profile
Retrosheet
The Baseball Cube
 Umpire Ejection Fantasy League Profile

1969 births
Living people
Baseball people from Connecticut
Major League Baseball umpires
Sportspeople from Bridgeport, Connecticut
University of Connecticut alumni